Qillwaqucha (Quechua qillwa, qiwlla, qiwiña gull, qucha lake, "gull lake", hispanicized spelling Quelluacocha) is a lake in Peru located in the Cajamarca Region, Cajamarca Province, Namora District. The village at its eastern shore is also named Qillwaqucha (Quelluacocha).

References 

Lakes of Cajamarca Region
Lakes of Peru